Carmine Benincasa (17 December 1947 – 3 August 2020) was an Italian art critic and art historian professor.

Biography 
Benincasa was born in Eboli in the south of Italy. After studying in a religious school he moved to Rome to study theology, philosophy and law.

He was a professor of art history at the Accademia di Belle Arti di Macerata, the Academy of Fine Arts in Florence and Professor of History of Art at the Faculty of Architecture of the University La Sapienza in Rome. During this period he met intellectuals like Jean-Paul Sartre, Jorge Luis Borges, Marguerite Yourcenar, Bruno Zevi and many more.

From 1978 to 1982 he was a member of the Venice Biennale Visual Arts Committee and an advisor to the Ministry of Culture and Environment. In 1994 he was briefly accused and incarcerated for defrauding collectors by validating and selling false artworks. The case was subsequently thrown out of court for lack of evidence. Benincasa was eventually cleared of every wrongdoing by the Supreme Court of Italy in 2014.

Benincasa published numerous essays, articles and monographs on artists such as Paul Klee, Antoni Tàpies, Renato Guttuso, Henry Moore, Mario Ceroli, Willem de Kooning, Joan Miró, Amedeo Modigliani, Giacomo Balla, Wassily Kandinsky, Henri Matisse and Giorgio Morandi. He also organized many international exhibitions, including a section of the Venice Biennale in 1982.

He died on 3 August 2020, aged 72.

Selected works 

 Chiesa e storia del cardinale Emmanuel Célestin Suhard e il Concilio Vaticano II – Ed. Paoline, 1967
 L’interpretazione tra futuro e utopia – Ed. Magma, Roma 1973
 Sul manierismo – Come dentro uno specchio, La Nuova Foglio Editrice 1975; 2° ed – Ed. Officina, Roma
 Babilonia in fiamme – Saggi sull’arte contemporanea – Ed. Electa, Milano 1978
 Architettura come dis-identità – Ed. Dedalo, Bari 1978
 L’altra scena – Saggi sul pensiero antico, medioevale e controrinascimentale – Ed. Dedalo, 1979
 Anabasi – Architettura e arte 1960/1980 – Ed. Dedalo, Bari 1980
 Joan Miró – Ed. 2C, Roma 1981
 Oskar Kokoschka - La mia vita – Ed. Marsilio, Venezia 1981
 Georges Braque – Opere dal 1900 al 1963 – Ed. Marsilio, Venezia 1982
 Verso l’altrove – Fogli eretici sull’arte contemporanea – Ed. Electa, Milano 1983
 Alvar Aalto – Ed. Leader, 1983
 Paul Klee – Ed. Marisa del Re Gallery, 1983
 Umberto Mastroianni – Monumenti 1945/1946 – Ed. Electa, Milano 1986
 Il colore e la luce – L’arte contemporanea – Ed. Spirali, Milano 1985
 André Masson – L’universo della pittura – Ed. Mondatori, Milano 1989
 Clara Halter - Trace - Ed. Robert Laffont; First Edition, 1992
 Il tutto in frammenti: Arte del XX secolo. Una nuova interpretazione storica,  Politi Editore, Milan, 1994

References

External links 
 artCellar
 openlibrary

1947 births
2020 deaths
People from Eboli
Italian art critics
Academic staff of the Sapienza University of Rome
Architectural theoreticians
Italian architecture writers
Italian essayists
Italian male non-fiction writers
Italian philosophers
Male essayists
Italian magazine editors